Emmanuel Leonardo Gómez (born March 30, 1987) is a Canadian former professional soccer player who played for Club Atlético Jorge Griffa.

Early life
Gómez was just two years old when he and his family moved to Victoria, British Columbia. Both of his parents were born in Mendoza, Argentina.

Career 
Gómez began his career in his hometown with the Victoria Football Academy and was 2005 scouted from Argentine top club Club Atlético River Plate. After three years with Club Atlético River Plate on their youth side, he signed his first professional contract with Club Social y Deportivo Tristán Suárez. Gómez played in his first professional season for CSD Tristán Suárez in the Argentine Primera B Metropolitana, playing twenty-seven games and  scoring seven goals. In January 2008 he joined Sportivo Barracas in the Primera C Metropolitana league. After two years with Sportivo Barracas, joined 2011 to Spanish lower side CD Binéfar. After one year in Spain returned to Argentine and signed for CA Griffa.

International career 
Gómez is former Canada men's national youth soccer teams player who played two games for the U-15 and one game for the U-20 of Canada. On 18. January 2013 earned his first call-up for the Canadian national men's soccer team but failed to make an appearance.

References

1987 births
Living people
Canadian expatriate soccer players
Canadian expatriate sportspeople in Spain
Canadian soccer players
Club Atlético River Plate footballers
Sportspeople from Mendoza, Argentina
Soccer players from Victoria, British Columbia
Argentine emigrants to Canada
Argentine expatriate sportspeople in Spain
Association football midfielders
Expatriate footballers in Spain
Canada men's youth international soccer players
CD Binéfar players